Christof Oldani (born 3 February 1974) is a retired Swiss football midfielder.

References

1974 births
Living people
Swiss men's footballers
FC Wettingen players
FC Winterthur players
FC Aarau players
FC Baden players
Association football midfielders